Plasmonics is a bimonthly peer-reviewed scientific journal covering plasmonics, including the theory of plasmonic metamaterials, fluorescence and surface-enhanced Raman spectroscopy. It is published by Springer Science+Business Media. Its current editor is Chris D. Geddes, Director of the Institute of Fluorescence at the University of Maryland Biotechnology Institute. According to the Journal Citation Reports, the journal has a 2021 impact factor of 2.726.

Abstracting and indexing 
The journal is abstracted and indexed in:
 Science Citation Index Expanded
 Current Contents/Physical, Chemical & Earth Sciences
 EBSCO Academic Search
 EBSCO Discovery Service
 EBSCO Engineering Source
 EBSCO STM Source
 ProQuest Advanced Technologies & Aerospace Database
 ProQuest Central
 ProQuest SciTech Premium Collection
 ProQuest Technology Collection
 ProQuest-ExLibris Primo
 ProQuest-ExLibris Summon

References

External links 
 

Springer Science+Business Media academic journals
Optics journals
Nanotechnology journals
Materials science journals
English-language journals
Bimonthly journals
Publications established in 2006